The 2017 NCAA Division I Women's Lacrosse Championship is the 36th annual single-elimination tournament to determine the national champion of Division I NCAA women's college lacrosse. The semifinal and championship rounds will be played at Gillette Stadium in Foxborough, Massachusetts from May 26–28, 2017. All other rounds were played at campus sites, usually at the home field of the higher-seeded team, from May 12–21.

Tournament field
All NCAA Division I women's lacrosse programs were eligible for this championship, and a total of 26 teams were invited to participate. 13 teams qualified automatically by winning their conference tournaments while the remaining 13 teams qualified at-large based on their regular season records.

Seeds

1. Maryland (19-0)
2. North Carolina (16-2)
3. Florida (17-2)
4. Penn State (15-3)
5. Princeton (14-3)
6. Syracuse (15-6)
7. Penn (13-3)
8. Stony Brook (18-1)

Teams

Bracket 

*First and second round host.

See also 
 NCAA Division II Women's Lacrosse Championship 
 NCAA Division III Women's Lacrosse Championship

References

NCAA Division I Women's Lacrosse Championship
 
NCAA Women's Lacrosse Championship
NCAA Division I Women's Lacrosse Championship
NCAA Division I Women's Lacrosse Championship
NCAA Division I Women's Lacrosse Championship
College sports in Massachusetts
Lacrosse in Massachusetts
Sports competitions in Foxborough, Massachusetts